Sætre may refer to:

Places
Sætre, Asker, a village in Asker municipality, Viken county, Norway
Sætre, Hedmark, a village in Elverum municipality, Hedmark county, Norway
Sætre, Møre og Romsdal, a village in Ørsta municipality, Møre og Romsdal county, Norway

People
Johan Sætre (born 1952), Norwegian former ski jumper
Lasse Sætre (born 1974), Norwegian former speed skater
Magnar Sætre (1940-2002), Norwegian politician for the Labour Party

Other
Sætre (company), a Norwegian biscuit company established in 1883